Kinner Airplane & Motor Corp was an airplane and engine manufacturer, founded, in the mid-1920s, in Glendale, California, United States, by Bert Kinner, the manager of Kinner Field. Kinner's chief engineer was Max B. Harlow who later founded the Harlow Aircraft Company. It went bankrupt in 1937, and the aircraft rights were sold to O.W. Timm Aircraft Company. The engine department was rearranged as Kinner Motor Inc in 1938, but collapsed in 1946.  Kinner became the West Coast's largest producer of aircraft engines in 1941.

Products

Aircraft

Engines

References

External links

 Aerofiles
 Enthusiasts' page
 Vintage engines
 "Wings Of Airplane Fold Up In Three Minutes" Kinner K-5 Sportster with optional wing fold, Popular Mechanics, March 1934
 "Air Riddles and The Answers" Kinner Courier, Popular Mechanics, February 1930 page 277

Defunct aircraft manufacturers of the United States
Defunct aircraft engine manufacturers of the United States
Companies based in Glendale, California